Conactiodoria is a genus of tachinid flies in the family Tachinidae.

Species
Conactiodoria aleurites Townsend, 1940
Conactiodoria aurea Townsend, 1934

Distribution
Brazil.

References

Exoristinae
Diptera of South America
Tachinidae genera
Taxa named by Charles Henry Tyler Townsend